Sir Shadi Lal  (14 May 1874 – 27 March 1945) was an Indian jurist. He served as the Chief justice of Lahore High Court between 1920 and 1934. 

Lal was the first Indian to become a Chief justice of any High Court in India.

Lal was born in Rewari, Punjab Province (now Haryana in India) in an Agrawal family. His father, Lala Ram Prasad, was a wealthy businessman. Lal was educated at Punjab University and Balliol College, Oxford. He was called to the English bar at Gray's Inn in 1899. Returning to India, he was called to the Lahore bar, and became Principal of the Law College, Lahore, and Dean of the Law Faculty of Punjab University. He was elected to the Punjab Legislative Council by Punjab University in 1909, and was re-elected in 1912 and 1913.

Lal was appointed a Judge of the Lahore High Court in 1919, and promoted Chief Justice in 1920, becoming the first Indian to head an Indian high court. He was knighted in the 1921 New Year Honours. 

In 1934, he was appointed to the Judicial Committee of the Privy Council and sworn of the Privy Council under the provisions of the Appellate Jurisdiction Act 1929, in succession to Sir Dinshah Mulla. He resigned in 1938 and returned to India.

References

Knights Bachelor
1945 deaths
People from Rewari
University of the Punjab alumni
Alumni of Balliol College, Oxford
Members of Gray's Inn
Indian Knights Bachelor
Members of the Privy Council of the United Kingdom
Members of the Judicial Committee of the Privy Council
Indian judges
1874 births
Chief Justices of the Lahore High Court
Academic staff of Punjab University Law College
Judges in British India